Sir Douglas Julian Carter  (5 August 1908 – 7 November 1988) was a New Zealand politician of the National Party.

Biography

Carter was born at Foxton in 1908, the son of Walter S. Carter. He received his education from Palmerston North and Waitaki Boys' High Schools. Afterwards, he was a farmer and active in various farming organisations. He was chairman of the New Zealand Pig Producers council, and was with the New Zealand Sharemilkers Employers Association, the Waikato Province Dairy Section of Federated Farmers, and was on the Waikato Primary Producers council.

In 1936, Carter married Mavis Rose Miles.

He was Minister of Agriculture under Keith Holyoake (1969–1972) and then John Marshall (1972), followed by Minister of Agriculture and Fisheries (New Zealand) (1972). He was Postmaster-General from 1969 to 1972. He retired from Parliament in 1975 and was succeeded by Marilyn Waring.

From 1976 to 1979, Carter was the High Commissioner to the United Kingdom.

In the 1977 Queen's Silver Jubilee and Birthday Honours, Carter was appointed a Knight Commander of the Order of St Michael and St George, for public services.

Last years and death
The Carters lived in Taupiri. Douglas Carter died in Hamilton on 7 November 1988, aged 80, and was buried at Hamilton Park Cemetery.

Notes

References

Further reading
 Hon. Sir Douglas Julian Carter's political papers held by Archives New Zealand

1908 births
1988 deaths
New Zealand National Party MPs
Members of the Cabinet of New Zealand
High Commissioners of New Zealand to the United Kingdom
People educated at Palmerston North Boys' High School
People educated at Waitaki Boys' High School
New Zealand MPs for North Island electorates
New Zealand Knights Commander of the Order of St Michael and St George
People from Foxton, New Zealand
New Zealand farmers
Members of the New Zealand House of Representatives
20th-century New Zealand politicians
New Zealand politicians awarded knighthoods
Burials at Hamilton Park Cemetery